Pascal Breton is a French Producer & CEO especially known for creating the French Soap Opera Sous le soleil (aka St Tropez) and the first French Netflix Original Marseille.

He is the former CEO & President of Marathon Media Group and the current CEO of Federation Entertainment.

Biography

In 1990, Pascal Breton started his own production company, Marathon, in association with Olivier Brémond. In addition to managing the company, he worked on Marathon’s hit productions, including Saint Tropez (480 × 52 minutes), Babar  & Dolmen (6 × 90 minutes) among others.

At Zodiak, Pascal, acting as Senior Vice-President of Fiction, oversaw the distribution of Millennium as well as Versailles (Capa, Canal+).

In 2013, Pascal Breton launched Federation Entertainment, a new production and distribution studio dedicated to premium French and international series. There, he produced Netflix's first French series Marseille and co-produced the critically acclaimed French series The Bureau, an international success which was released on Amazon Prime UK & iTunes US, quickly reaching the Top 5 there. He is also co-producing upcoming series such as The Collection - Amazon's first European original about a fashion house in post-war Paris  - and the Finnish noir series Bordertown, along with many other projects.

Filmography

References

External links

Year of birth missing (living people)
Living people
French film producers
Showrunners
French television producers
French screenwriters